Tele SC Asmara (Telecommunications Sport Club of Asmara) is an Eritrean football club based in Asmara.  The team -usually called "Tele S.C."- is a member of the Eritrean Football Federation national league.

History

Initially the club was founded in the early 1940s as an Italo-eritrean club named Gejeret, that played in the amateur championship of Italian Eritrea. In 1950 Gejeret started to play in the top league of Eritrea in Asmara and changed the name to "Telecommunications SC" (usually called "Tele SC").

In the Ethiopian championship the team obtained prestigious levels. So, in 1959 the team has won the Ethiopian Premier League., The Eritrean team also won the Ethiopian championship in 1969 and 1970.

The team united with the historical GS Asmara in the early 1970s and changed again the name: it was now Tele SC Asmara. Under the lead of the famous "Eritrean Herrera" (the coach Massimo Fenili) the team won two titles of the Ethiopian National Championships in 1972 and 1973.

The team participated in four editions of the "African Cup of Champions Clubs".

Since the years of the struggle for Eritrea independence the team has entered in a deep crisis and started playing in secondary championships of Eritrea. Since 2016 it is no more active for economic reasons.

Stadium

Currently the team plays at the 20,000 capacity Cicero Stadium, created in the early 1940s.

Honours
 Ethiopian Premier League as "Tele SC": 1959, 1969, 1970
 Ethiopian Premier League as "Tele SC Asmara": 1972 and 1973

Performance in CAF competitions
CAF Champions League: 4 appearances
1970 African Cup of Champions Clubs
1971 African Cup of Champions Clubs
1973 African Cup of Champions Clubs
1974 African Cup of Champions Clubs

References

Football clubs in Eritrea
Football clubs in Ethiopia
 
Works association football clubs in Ethiopia
Organisations based in Asmara